Pollux b, also designated β Geminorum b (Latinized to beta Geminorum b, abbreviated, β Gem b) and HD 62509 b, formally named Thestias , is an extrasolar planet approximately 34 light-years away in the constellation of Gemini (the Twins). This planet was discovered orbiting the star Pollux in 2006 by astronomer Artie P. Hatzes, confirming his hypothesis originally published in 1993. The planet has at least twice the mass of Jupiter.

In July 2014 the International Astronomical Union launched NameExoWorlds, a process for giving proper names to certain exoplanets and their host stars. The process involved public nomination and voting for the new names. In December 2015, the IAU announced the winning name was Thestias for this planet. The winning name was based on that originally submitted by theSkyNet of Australia; namely Leda, Pollux's mother in Greek and Roman mythology. At the request of the IAU, 'Thestias' (the patronym of Leda, a daughter of Thestius) was substituted. This was because 'Leda' was already attributed to an asteroid and to one of Jupiter's satellites.

See also 
Gemini in Chinese astronomy
Cancer Minor (constellation) – Obsolete constellation inside modern Gemini
Sudarsky's gas giant classification

References

External links 
 
 
 

Pollux (star)
Gemini (constellation)
Giant planets
Exoplanets discovered in 2006
Exoplanets detected by radial velocity
Exoplanets with proper names